Whitney M. Young Magnet High School is a public 4–year magnet high school and middle school located in the Near West Side neighborhood in Chicago, Illinois, United States. Founded in 1970, Whitney Young is operated by the Chicago Public Schools district. Whitney Young opened on September 3, 1975 as the city's first public magnet high school. The school is named after Whitney Moore Young Jr., a prominent African-American civil rights leader.

History
The Chicago Public Schools announced plans for a public magnet high school on the city's Near West Side in mid–1970. A proposal by community residents called for a high school to be built at 211 South Laflin, which was an empty lot that had been burned out during the riots following the assassination of the Rev. Dr. Martin Luther King Jr. on April 4, 1968. Whitney Young opened for the 1975–1976 school year on September 3, 1975, as a selective enrollment school under the leadership of the school's first principal, Bernarr E. Dawson.

Founding faculty
The founding staff of Whitney M. Young Magnet High School:

Joe Korner – English
Jory Chelin – Math 
Melanie Wojtulewicz – Science 
Larry Minkoff – Social Studies
Roger Stewart – Tech
Sandra McKinley – Librarian
Dr. William Marshall – Hearing Impaired
 
The founding staff developed and planned the initial curriculum and policies for the school. The principal's secretary was Lillian O'Neill. The staff met for months unpaid in the unused John Phillips Sousa school building while the Young building was under construction.

Background

Admissions and Academic Center
Admission to Young is granted based on entrance exam performance, standardized test scores, and elementary school grades, and is open to all residents of Chicago, Illinois. The school consistently scores among the top high schools in the U.S. In 2009, Young was awarded the Blue Ribbon Award. The academic center is an accelerated program for seventh and eighth graders. Seventh and eighth graders are immersed in an intense high school experience, taking courses for high school credit. Classes include Honors Algebra I and Honors Environmental Science in seventh grade, and Honors Geometry, Honors Survey of Literature, Honors World History and Honors Biology in eighth grade.  In addition, students are allowed to select up to two elective classes each year.  There are many extracurricular programs for the students who attend the Academic Center, including basketball, cross country, track and math team.

Science Bowl and Math Team
The school's Science Bowl Team won the Regional National Science Bowl Championship in 2016, 2017, 2018, and 2019. They advanced to the National Finals in Washington, D.C., representing the city of Chicago. Notable achievements include placing first in the Division Team Challenge at the National Finals in 2016. Young Math Team competes in several local and national competitions, including the City of Chicago Math League, the North Suburban Math League, the Illinois Council of Teachers of Mathematics competition, the American Mathematics Competitions, and the Mandelbrot Competition. The team won the 2013 and 2014 4AA Illinois Council of Teachers of Mathematics (ICTM) State Championship and finished second and third in 2015 and 2016 respectively.

Academic Decathlon
The Academic Decathlon team has been the Illinois State Champions for 34 out the last 35 years and finished second place in the nation in 2012. During the 1995 Illinois State Championship, Young was outscored by the team from Steinmetz High School, though it was later revealed that Steinmetz had obtained a copy of the test in advance. The Steinmetz team was stripped of the title and it was awarded to Young. The situation involving the two schools was dramatized in the HBO film Cheaters.

Debate team
A two-student debate team from Young won the National Forensics League National Speech and Debate Tournament in policy debate in 2010, becoming the first team from an urban debate league to achieve a national championship. Whitney Young also won the NAUDL Chase Urban Debate National Championship in 2010.

Athletics

Young competes in the Chicago Public League (CPL) and is a member of the Illinois High School Association (IHSA). Young sports teams are nicknamed "Dolphins". Young has 52 athletic teams of 12 different sports. The boys' basketball team won the IHSA state championships four times (1997–1998, 2008–2009, 2013–2014 and 2016–2017). The girls' basketball team won the state championship three times (2007–2008, 2011–2012 and 2013–2014). The girls' tennis team won the state championship in 2017. The schools' chess team won the IHSA state championship four times (2010–2011, 2012–2013, 2013–2014, and 2015–2016).
Michelle Obama is the namesake of a 4.3 million dollar athletics complex opened in 2019. Chicago Public Schools received funding for the complex through Tax Increment Financing (TIF).

Extra-curricular activities
The Whitney Young Streaming Radio Station, known as WY Stream, was started on December 9, 2004 to showcase the achievements of students and staff. Stream TV was added in 2006, and includes shows about the school, as well as news clips and internal features. The Whitney Young theater company ("The Young Company") has performed such works as Tommy, Jesus Christ Superstar, Beethoven's Last Night, Moulin Rouge!, A Funny Thing Happened on the Way to the Forum, and West Side Story. In 1996, several Young students worked to organize the student body and find faculty and administration support for the Gay Pride Club. One of the organization's founders later became a member of the Chicago School Board.  Also, students were inducted into the Chicago Gay and Lesbian Hall of Fame.

Other information

2009 investigations into admissions
In September 2009, Whitney Young principal Joyce Kenner and Chicago Board of Education President Michael W. Scott were called to testify before a federal grand jury investigating how students were chosen for admission to Chicago's elite public schools. According to a July 21, 2009, subpoena released by school officials, prosecutors sought the names of students who applied to be among a select group of students hand-picked by principals of schools. The subpoena also sought e-mails and other correspondence with "public officials" about applicants. Two alderman acknowledged that they asked Kenner for help securing admission to the school for relatives and constituents. In 2011, the Chicago Public Schools Inspector General recommended that selective enrollment schools reevaluate their use of "principal picks". Several political figures had used their influence to secure their children's admission into schools like Young. Kenner responded that she had used her principal picks on a wide range of students, and that only one of those students in 16 years had failed to graduate.

Notable alumni

Katrina Adams, tennis player, president of the USTA (United States Tennis Association)
Luvvie Ajayi, New York Times bestselling author, blogger, digital strategist
Sharif Atkins (1993) – actor
Steelo Brim (2006) – actor, comedian, and television personality
DuShon Monique Brown (1987) – actress
Dominique Canty (1995) – WNBA basketball player
Open Mike Eagle, rapper
Don Franklin, singer, actor
Dennis Gates, University of Missouri Men's Basketball head coach
Joan Higginbotham (1982) – NASA astronaut
Ron Howard (2001) – former professional basketball player
Santita Jackson (1981) – singer and political commentator, daughter of civil rights activist Rev. Jesse Jackson
Marcus Jordan (2009) – college basketball player, son of basketball player Michael Jordan
Arlene Limas (1984) – first American to win an Olympic gold medal in taekwondo, 1988 Olympics
Jamilah Lemieux, writer
Russell Maryland, NFL football player
Jonathan McReynolds, gospel musician
Vic Mensa, rapper, one of the founding members of the Hip Hop Collective Savemoney
Kamau Murray, tennis coach
Safiya Nygaard (2010) – YouTuber and Internet Celebrity
Psalm One, rapper
Joey Purp (rapper), one of the founding members of the Hip Hop Collective Savemoney
Lucas Neff, actor (Raising Hope)
Michelle Obama (1981) – former and first African-American First Lady of the United States 
Jahlil Okafor (2014) – NBA basketball player
Tonya Pinkins, actress
Carlos Ramirez-Rosa, Chicago alderman (35th Ward) 2015–present
Quentin Richardson (1998) – NBA basketball player
Craig Robinson, actor and comedian
Nico Segal, musician, widely known as Donnie Trumpet, most famous for his trumpet playing, one of the founding members of Savemoney
Anthony Sparks, playwright and television writer/producer (The Blacklist, Queen Sugar)
Ethan Stoller, composer
John Tobias, best known for co-creating the Mortal Kombat series of video games
Lilly and Lana Wachowski, film directors, writers and producers, most famous for creating The Matrix series
Kay Adams, sports personality 
Bashir Salahuddin (1994) – actor, writer, and comedian

References

External links
 Whitney M. Young Magnet High School
 Whitney M. Young Magnet High School on Edline

Educational institutions established in 1975
1975 establishments in Illinois
Young
Young